Smart car may refer to:

 Smart (marque), the automobile brand
 Smartcar (company), the API developer platform company
 Autonomous car, an automobile capable of driving itself
 Connected car, an automobile that coordinates its navigation with others'
 Vehicular automation, using artificial intelligence to enhance or automate control of a vehicle.